Papilio androgeus, the Androgeus swallowtail, queen page, or queen swallowtail, is a Neotropical butterfly of the family Papilionidae. It is found from Mexico to Argentina with a small population in southern Florida.

Description
The sexes are different and the female occurs in many districts in two forms. Tail narrow, pointed. Hindwing above with narrow bluish submarginal crescents, beneath with a regular row of reddish yellow crescents between cell and outer margin.

Female P. androgeus has on the forewing two large yellow patches, sometimes also a small spot; in the female P. piranthus these spots are wanting or are merely indicated, the metallic scaling of the hindwing is not dense and extends into the cell.

The wingspan is 134–140 mm.

Biology
Adults are on wing from April to October in multiple generations per year.

The larvae feed on the leaves of Zanthoxylum elephantiasis, Citrus reticulata, and Citrus sinensis. Adults feed on nectar of various flowers.

Subspecies
Papilio androgeus androgeus – (Suriname, Colombia, Ecuador to Bolivia, Brazil (Amazonas, Pará, Mato Grosso))
Papilio androgeus epidaurus Godman & Salvin, 1890 – (Florida, Mexico, Panama, Cuba to Santa Lucia) male: the yellow area very broad: female: forewing with indications of a yellow band outside the cell; the grey-blue scaling on the hindwing dense.
Papilio androgeus laodocus  (Fabricius, 1793)  – (Brazil (Minas Gerais, Paraná), Paraguay, Argentina) the yellow area of the male is pale, the small spots placed before the extremity of the cell are smaller and often entirely wanting. Only one female known; this is similar to the female androgeus of the nominate subspecies, but the upper yellow spot is smaller than the second.

Threats
Generally common and not so far threatened. Tolerant of open areas and secondary growth.

References

Lewis, H. L. (1974). Butterflies of the World  Page 24, figures 11 (female), 12 (male).

External links

Butterflies and Moths of North America
Butterflycorner Images from Naturhistorisches Museum Wien

androgeus
Butterflies of North America
Butterflies of Central America
Butterflies of the Caribbean
Papilionidae of South America
Butterflies of Cuba
Butterflies described in 1775